Koit Toome (born 3 January 1979), is an Estonian singer and musical actor.

He has twice represented Estonia in the Eurovision Song Contest. In 1998 he finished 12th with the song "Mere lapsed". In 2017 he sang a duet with Laura Põldvere, entitled "Verona".

Career 
Koit Toome was discovered in the music school in 1994 by the music producer Mikk Targo who was initially planning to launch a solo career for Koit. It later turned out that Koit's schoolmate and initial backing vocalist Sirli Hiius harmonized perfectly with Koit. Due to this, Koit's solo turned into a pop duo, Code One, which enjoyed a successful run of top hits that over the years have become evergreens. Toome and Hiius sometimes nevertheless perform together, despite having called the active years as a singing duo to an end years ago.

In 1998, Koit Toome represented Estonia at the Eurovision Song Contest, held in Birmingham. He finished 12th with 36 points with the song "Mere lapsed". The same year he recorded his debut solo album of mostly self-penned material on it. Toome has released five albums all together, both as a solo artist, and with Code One. His latest studio album, "Kaugele siit" ("Far from here") was released in March 2010.

In 2007, Koit Toome was declared as the winner of Tantsud tähtedega (Dancing with the Stars) with his partner on floor, Kertu Tänav.

Koit Toome has also embarked on a voice acting career, dubbing animated films. He provided the Estonian voice for Lightning McQueen in the Disney movie Cars among others.

In 2017, Koit Toome and Laura Põldvere won Eesti Laul with the duet "Verona." They thereafter represented Estonia in the Eurovision Song Contest 2017 in Kyiv, Ukraine. The duo failed to advance to the Grand Final and finished in 14th place (placing 6th in the televoting & 17th with the juries), despite being a big fan favourite and seen as likely qualifiers beforehand, being 5th in the 2nd semi-final by odds and 5th by OGAE voting overall.

Toome attempted to represent Estonia in the Eurovision Song Contest 2021 by participating in Eesti Laul 2021 with his song "We Could Have Been Beautiful". He placed fourth in the national final.

Musical theatre 
Koit Toome is professionally active in musical theatre. As a leading actor, he has so far played the roles of the protagonists only with no exception in his native Estonia, and also with touring companies.

His debut, Alfred in Tanz der Vampire (Tallinn, 2000) was shortly followed by Marius of Les Misérables (Tallinn, 2001), Chris in Miss Saigon (Tallinn, 2002, reprised in Helsinki City Theatre) and Tony in West Side Story (Tartu, 2005). Leading roles in Chess, Rent and Hair were to follow in Estonia and (Germany).

In Endla Theatre in Pärnu, he played the lead in Peter Quilter's musical Boyband, depicting the life of a fictional boyband Freedom. The show would stay on stage for a successful run of 100 performances, and for 5 seasons.

Koit Toome was starring as Raoul in The Phantom of the Opera in theatre Vanemuine (2014–2016), but he took over the leading role of "Phantom" from its originator, the Norwegian tenor Stephen Hansen for the final run of performances in 2016/2017 and 2020/2021. Koit Toome continues at the Vanemuine theatre for the Estonian revival of Les Misérables, now cast as Jean Valjean. It premiered in November 2017.

Personal life 
Koit's uncle Indrek Toome was the Prime Minister of Estonia from 1988 to 1990.

Discography

Singles

As lead artist

As featured artist

Filmography

Dubbing

References

External links 

1979 births
20th-century Estonian male actors
21st-century Estonian male actors
Estonian male child actors
Eurovision Song Contest entrants for Estonia
21st-century Estonian male singers
Estonian male musical theatre actors
Estonian male voice actors
Estonian pianists
Eurovision Song Contest entrants of 1998
Eurovision Song Contest entrants of 2017
Living people
Singers from Tallinn
Male actors from Tallinn
20th-century Estonian male singers
Male pianists
21st-century pianists
Eesti Laul winners